Labastide-d'Armagnac is a commune in the Landes department in Nouvelle-Aquitaine in south-western France.

It hosts Notre Dame des Cyclistes.
It was founded in 1291 by Bernard VI, Count of Armagnac.

See also
Communes of the Landes department

References

Labastidedarmagnac